"La Vida" is a song by Dominican singer Henry Santos featuring Urban Music artist Maffio. It served as the third single for Santos's second album My Way (2013). The music video was released on May 2, 2014.

Charts

See also
 List of Billboard Tropical Airplay number ones of 2014

References

2013 songs
2013 singles
Henry Santos songs
Universal Music Latin Entertainment singles